Hexham railway station is located on the Main Northern line in New South Wales, Australia. It serves the western Newcastle suburb of Hexham, and was opened on 1 August 1871.

Hexham originally had a substantial brick platform building; however, this was demolished in May 1993 and replaced with a lightweight bus-shelter type structure. The station has a full-length island platform; however, the eastern end has been fenced off to a shorter two carriage train length.

Until 1987, the Richmond Vale's exchange sidings were located opposite Hexham station.

In November 2014, the Australian Rail Track Corporation completed a project that saw the westbound coal road relocated further south to make way for five 1,800 metre passing loops.

South of the coal road, Aurizon have a locomotive depot.

Platforms and services
Hexham has one island platform with two faces. It is serviced by NSW TrainLink Hunter Line services travelling between Newcastle, Maitland and Telarah. It is also serviced by one early morning service to Scone.

References

External links

Hexham station details Transport for New South Wales

Railway stations in the Hunter Region
Railway stations in Australia opened in 1871
Regional railway stations in New South Wales
Short-platform railway stations in New South Wales, 2 cars
Main North railway line, New South Wales